Power of the Damn Mixxxer is a remix album by American metal band Prong. It consists of remixed versions of all the tracks from their 2007 album, Power of the Damager.

Track listing

Personnel
Tommy Victor - vocals, guitar
Monte Pittman - bass, backing vocals
Aaron Rossi - drums
Al Jourgensen - keyboards on "The Banishment (Bitter Harvest Mix)"

References 

Prong (band) albums
2009 remix albums